Marko "Mare" Kon (born 20 April 1972) is a Serbian recording artist.

He was the Serbian entry for the Eurovision Song Contest 2009 alongside Milan Nikolić, where they did not manage to qualify for the finals.

Early life
Kon was born to a Serbian-Jewish father and Serbian mother.

Career
As a vocalist, Kon has recorded three solo albums and contributed vocals to recordings of over thirty artists, including Dalibor Andonov Gru, Maja Nikolić, Mira Škorić, Goga Sekulić, Sky Wikluh, Jelena Tomašević, Aleksandra Radović, Boban Rajović, Reni and Aleksa Vukašinović. His work as an arranger includes collaborations with over fifty artists, notably with Dara Bubamara, Nikola Bulatović, Enes Ukić, Louis, Flamingosi, Lejla Hot, Djogani and Fantastic Band. Kon considers his collaboration with the rapper Gru on his 1995 album as his "big breakthrough" in the industry.

Eurovision Song Contest 2009
In 2009, Kon collaborated with Milan Nikolić to perform "Cipela" at the Eurovision Song Contest 2009. The song was chosen after a national final. It competed in the second semi-final, but failed to reach the final.

References

External links

1972 births
Living people
Serbian record producers
Serbian multi-instrumentalists
Serbian baritones
Eurovision Song Contest entrants of 2009
Eurovision Song Contest entrants for Serbia
Serbian people of Jewish descent
Beovizija contestants
Beovizija winners